William Arlen Jennings (March 13, 1918 – June 8, 2002) was an American football player and coach.  He served as the head football coach of the University of Nebraska–Lincoln from 1957 to 1961. He coached the Nebraska Cornhuskers for five losing seasons, compiling a 15–34–1 record (.310). His best seasons were 1959 and 1960, when the Huskers were 4–6 in each year.  His conference record was 8–24 (.250) and his Husker teams never won more than two conference games in a season.

Among Jennings's most notable upsets was the ending of Bud Wilkinson's 74-straight conference victories. The Cornhuskers beat the Oklahoma Sooners, 25–21, at Nebraska's 1959 homecoming game on Halloween. Jennings followed up a second consecutive win the following year with a 17–14 victory in Norman. The 1959 win was the first for Nebraska since 1942, and the 1959 and 1960 wins were the first consecutive victories over the Sooners since 1939 through 1942.

After a 3–6–1 season in 1961, Jennings was succeeded by Bob Devaney, who had been successful with Wyoming. Devaney immediately turned the Nebraska program around, winning with numerous players recruited by Jennings. The 1962 Huskers went 8–2 in the regular season and won the Gotham Bowl, Nebraska's first bowl game appearance in eight years and the first of 41 consecutive winning seasons.

Jennings died on June 8, 2002, at the age of 84 at his home in Lawrence, Kansas after suffering from prostate cancer.

Head coaching record

College

References

External links
 Nebraska profile

1918 births
2002 deaths
American football ends
Nebraska Cornhuskers football coaches
Oklahoma Sooners football coaches
Oklahoma Sooners football players
High school football coaches in Oklahoma
Sportspeople from Norman, Oklahoma
Players of American football from Oklahoma
Washburn Ichabods athletic directors